Vamara Sanogo (born 22 April 1995) is a French professional footballer who plays as a forward for Marsaxlokk in the Maltese Premier League.

Career
After playing for Metz B, Sanogo signed for English club Fleetwood Town in May 2015. He moved on loan to Nuneaton Town in March 2016, before signing for Polish club Zagłębie Sosnowiec in August 2016. On 21 January 2017, he signed a four-and-a-half-year deal with Legia Warsaw. He returned to Zagłębie Sosnowiec on loan in August 2017. On 18 December 2020, his contract with Legia was terminated.

In January 2021 he signed for Georgian club Dinamo Batumi. He started the 2021–22 season with Górnik Zabrze, before rejoining Zagłębie Sosnowiec on 4 February 2022. He left the club by mutual consent on 14 June 2022.

On 18 July 2022 he signed for F.C. Kafr Qasim. He then played in Malta for Marsaxlokk.

Personal life
Born in France, Sanogo is of Ivorian descent.

Career statistics

References

1995 births
Living people
Sportspeople from Saint-Denis, Seine-Saint-Denis
Footballers from Seine-Saint-Denis
French footballers
French sportspeople of Ivorian descent
FC Metz players
Fleetwood Town F.C. players
Nuneaton Borough F.C. players
Zagłębie Sosnowiec players
Legia Warsaw players
FC Dinamo Batumi players
Górnik Zabrze players
F.C. Kafr Qasim players
Marsaxlokk F.C. players
English Football League players
National League (English football) players
I liga players
Ekstraklasa players
Maltese Premier League players
Association football forwards
French expatriate footballers
French expatriate sportspeople in England
Expatriate footballers in England
French expatriate sportspeople in Poland
Expatriate footballers in Poland
French expatriate sportspeople in Georgia (country)
Expatriate footballers in Georgia (country)
French expatriate sportspeople in Israel
Expatriate footballers in Israel
French expatriate sportspeople in Malta
Expatriate footballers in Malta
Liga Leumit players